Russell Howland (1908 in Missouri - 1995) was an American music educator, one of the most highly regarded woodwind teachers in the US of his time. He studied at the University of Illinois and was professor of woodwinds at the University of Michigan until 1948.

After 1948, Howland settled at the state college in Fresno, California, where he was active as an arranger and composer for wind band and clarinet choir.

In 1975 he was made a member of the hall of fame of the California Music Educators Association.

References

External links
 Russell Howland on Hearing the Sousa Band

1908 births
1995 deaths
American music educators
Woodwind musicians
University of Michigan faculty
20th-century American musicians